Charlie and Lola is a British animated children's television series based on the popular children's picture book series of the same name by Lauren Child. The show started on 7 November 2005. The series was produced by Tiger Aspect Productions, and has won multiple BAFTA awards. The animation uses a collage style that emulates the style of the original books. Charlie and Lola is also available on BBC iPlayer for over a year.

Synopsis 
Charlie has a little sister named Lola; she is 'small, and very funny'. Lola often gets caught up in situations that she (inadvertently) causes, whether it's running out of money at the zoo and having to borrow Charlie's, to forgetting her entire suitcase when having a sleepover at a friend's house. These situations are sometimes comedic (for example, in the episode 'Help! I Really Mean It!') but often reflect real world problems that younger children may face, for example losing a best friend, not getting the preferred part in a school play, or becoming too excited about an upcoming event and accidentally ruining it.

When these situations happen, Charlie usually ends up having to solve her problems through imaginative or creative methods, or by explaining to Lola where she went wrong. This is particularly demonstrated in the debut episode, 'I Will Never Not Ever Eat A Tomato', in which Charlie pretends that her least favourite food (such as carrots, mashed potatoes, fish fingers, and tomatoes) are more fantastical items in order to encourage her to eat them, such as 'orange twiglets from Jupiter' and 'ocean nibblers from the supermarket under the sea'. This may encourage young children to eat particular healthy foods that would otherwise come across as undesirable to them.

In many episodes, Lola's best friend Lotta, Lola's imaginary friend Soren Lorenson, and Charlie's best friend Marv become involved in some way or another. Although adults are mentioned through dialogue, none of them are ever shown or heard on-screen.

Episodes

Characters
 Charlie Sonner (voiced by Jethro Lundie-Brown in Season 1, Daniel Mayers in Season 2, and Oriel Agranoff in Season 3.)
 Lola Sonner (voiced by Maisie Cowell in Season 1, Clementine Cowell in Season 2, and Holly Callaway in Season 3.)
 Lotta (voiced by Morgan Gayle)
 Marv Lowe (voiced by Ryan Harris)
 Morten Lowe (voiced by Macauley Keeper)
 Arnold Wolf (voiced by Eoin O'Sulivan)
 Minnie Reader (voiced by Katie Hedges)
 Evie (voiced by Lara Mayers)
 Soren Lorenson (voiced by Stanley Street)
Many adult characters never appeared in the show

Animation style 
The television series uses a collage style of animation which captures the style of the original books. 2D Flash animation, paper cutout, fabric design, real textures, photomontage, and archive footage are all employed and subsequently animated in software applications called Adobe Animate, ToonBoom, Adobe Flash, Adobe After Effects, and CelAction2D.

The cartoons are also notable for their use of children rather than adult voice actors, a technique pioneered by the Peanuts television specials. Both the books and the cartoon also follow a technique of never showing adults.

Home releases 
 Charlie and Lola 1 – 13 February 2006
 Charlie and Lola 2 – 22 May 2006
 Charlie and Lola 3 – 4 September 2006
 Charlie and Lola 4 – 6 November 2006
 Charlie and Lola 5 – 5 March 2007
 Charlie and Lola 6 – 28 May 2007
 Charlie and Lola: The Absolutely Complete Series 1 (box set of DVDs 1–4) – 13 August 2007
 Charlie and Lola: The Absolutely Complete Series 1 (in metal lunch box) – 10 September 2007
 Charlie and Lola 7 – 24 September 2007
 Charlie and Lola 8 – 19 November 2007
 Charlie and Lola 9 (I Really Really Need Actual Ice Skates and Other Stories) – 27 October 2008
 Charlie and Lola: The Absolutely Complete Series 2 (box set of DVDs 5–8) – 10 November 2008
 Charlie and Lola 10 (I Can't Stop Hiccupping and Other Stories) – 23 February 2009
 Charlie and Lola 11 (Everything is Different and Not the Same) – 12 October 2009
 Charlie and Lola: The Absolutely Complete Series 3 (box set of DVDs 9–11) – 28 June 2010
 Charlie and Lola – The Absolutely Complete Collection (box set of all 11 DVDs) – 29 November 2010
In the United States and Canada, volumes 4 and 5 are reversed, as well as volumes 9 and 11. However
, volume 9 is titled "What Can I Wear for Halloween?" instead of "Everything is Different and Not the Same"

International transmission 
  Playhouse Disney (2005-2011) / Disney Junior (2011-2014)
  Discovery Kids Latinoamérica (2006-09, 2016-18) and CBeebies (2009-13)
  Elnueve, Artear
  Ecuavisa and Ecuador TV
  Once TV Discovery Kids
  Clan and Canal Super3, Playhouse Disney, Disney Channel, Disney Junior
  TV Red
  Televisión Nacional Uruguay
  Señal Colombia
  TVes
  Telefe and Elnueve

Awards and nominations 
Cartoons on the Bay 2006
 Awarded Best Series For Infants
 Awarded Best Programme
 Awarded The Raisat YOYO Best Series
BAFTA Children's Awards 2006
 Nominated for Best Pre-school Animation Series
Bradford Animation Festival 2006
 Awarded Best TV Series for Children and Adults
 Royal Television Society Educational Programme Awards 2006
 Nominated for Best Children's Programme for the episode Welcome To Lolaland
 BAFTA Children's Awards 2007
 Awarded Best Pre-school Animation Series
 Awarded Best Writer (Bridget Hurst)
 Nominated for Best Writer (Anna Starkey)
 Nominated for Best Animation (for "Charlie and Lola Christmas Special")
 Royal Television Society Craft and Design Awards 2006–2007
 Awarded Best Music Original Score (John Greswell and David Schweitzer)
 Annecy Animation Festival 2007
Awarded Special Award for a TV Series (for the episode I Will Be Especially, Very Careful)
 Broadcast Awards 2007
 Awarded Best Children's Programme
 34th Annual Annie Awards (2007)
 Nominated for Best Animated Television Production
 BAFTA Children's Awards 2008
 Awarded Best Animation (for the "Charlie and Lola Autumn Special")
 Awarded Best Pre-school Animation Series
 Nominated for Best Writer (Dave Ingham)

References

External links
 
 Charlie and Lola, Sohu

 http://www.bbc.co.uk/pressoffice/pressreleases/stories/2005/10_october/10/lola_characters.shtml

Charlie and Lola
2000s British children's television series
2000s British animated television series
2005 British television series debuts
British television series with live action and animation
BBC children's television shows
British children's animated adventure television series
British children's animated comedy television series
British flash animated television series
British preschool education television series
British television shows based on children's books
Animated preschool education television series
2000s preschool education television series
Animated television series about children
Animated television series about siblings
BAFTA winners (television series)
Endemol Shine Group franchises
Disney Channel original programming
Disney Junior original programming
Television series by Endemol
Television series by Tiger Aspect Productions
Television shows set in London
CBeebies
2000s animated television series
English-language television shows